Laurynas Grigelis and Zdeněk Kolář were the defending champions but chose not to defend their title.

Sriram Balaji and Vishnu Vardhan won the title after Mikhail Elgin and Denis Istomin withdrew from the final.

Seeds

Draw

References
 Main Draw

Samarkand Challenger - Doubles
2018 Doubles